Reitplatz is a sports field and recreation area located in Winterthur, Switzerland. Its primary tenant is FC Töss. In addition to football matches, Reitplatz has been used several times for cultural events, such as the Out in the Green Festival in 1994.

References

Buildings and structures in Switzerland